Ian Griffiths may refer to:

 Ian Griffiths (footballer) (born 1960), English footballer
 Ian Griffiths (businessman) (born 1966), British businessman

See also
 Iwan Griffiths (born 1985), drummer for Welsh rock band The Automatic
 Ian Griffith (1925–1992), Australian politician